Events in the year 1816 in Art.

Events
 The Elgin Marbles are purchased by the British government from Thomas Bruce, 7th Earl of Elgin, for the British Museum in London.
 The Fitzwilliam Museum is founded by the bequest of the art collection of the 7th Viscount FitzWilliam to the University of Cambridge in England.
 In Paris, the Académie de peinture et de sculpture (founded in 1648) is merged with the Académie de musique (1669) and the Académie royale d'architecture (1671) to form the Académie des beaux-arts.
Penance from Nicholas Poussin's first  of two Seven Sacraments painting cycles owned by the Duke of Rutland is destroyed by fire at Belvoir Castle in Leicestershire, England.

Works
 Cádiz Memorial (London)
 Augustus Wall Callcott – The Entrance to the Pool of London
 John James Chalon – Napoleon on board the Bellerophon
 John Constable – Wivenhoe Park
 Pavel Đurković – Portrait of Vuk Karadžić
 Francisco Goya
 The Duke of Osuna
 Unfortunate events in the front seats of the ring of Madrid, and the death of the Mayor of Torrejón (etching)
 John Linnell – Portrait of Richard Trevithick
 John Martin – Joshua Commanding the Sun to Stand Still upon Gibeon

Births
February 22 – Thomas Gambier Parry, English artist and art collector (died 1888)
March 18  – Antonio Salviati, Italian glassmaker (died 1890)
May 24 – Emanuel Leutze, German American painter (died 1868)
 date unknown – Paul Emile Chappuis, French-born photographer (died 1887)

Deaths
January 15 – Ludwig Guttenbrunn, Austrian painter (born 1750)
February 19 – Margareta Alströmer, Swedish painter and singer and a member of the Royal Swedish Academy of Arts (born 1763)
June 12 – Yves-Marie Le Gouaz, French engraver (born 1742)
June 16 – Carlo Antonio Porporati, Italian engraver and painter (born 1741)
July 7 – Francis Towne, English water-colour painter (born 1739)
July 11 – Philippe-Laurent Roland, French sculptor (born 1746)
July 23 – William Alexander, English painter, illustrator and engraver (born 1767)
August 4 – François-André Vincent, French painter (born 1746)
August 7 – François-Joseph Duret, French sculptor (born 1732)
August 13 – Pehr Hilleström, Swedish painter and teacher (born 1732)
August 26 – Robert Fagan, Irish painter, diplomat and archaeologist (born 1761)
 date unknown
 Henri Auguste, Parisian gold- and silversmith (born 1759)
 Christian Gottlob Fechhelm, German portrait and historical painter (born 1732)
 François-Guillaume Ménageot, French painter of religious and French historical scenes (born 1744)

References

 
Years of the 19th century in art
1810s in art